Gregory McAulay (born January 2, 1960) is a Canadian World champion curler from Richmond, British Columbia.

Career
McAulay has been to two Briers in his career. At the 1998 Labatt Brier, he skipped his British Columbia team to a 7-4 record in the round robin before losing to Saskatchewan (skipped by Rod Montgomery) in a tie-breaker.

In the 2000 Labatt Brier, his team of himself, Brent Pierce, Bryan Miki and Jody Sveistrup finished with an impressive 9-2 record to finish in first place after the round robin. In the playoffs, he defeated Russ Howard's New Brunswick rink twice to capture his only Brier title. 

This Brier win qualified McAulay for the 2000 Ford World Curling Championships, where he would skip the Canadian team. At the Worlds, he finished with an 8-1 record. He defeated Craig Brown's American rink in the semi-final, then Peja Lindholm's Swedish rink in the final.

Awards
British Columbia Sports Hall of Fame: inducted in 2002 with all of 2000 Greg McAulay team, Canadian and World champions

Personal life
McAulay's niece is Manitoba curler Kerri Einarson.

References

External links
 

1960 births
Brier champions
Curlers from British Columbia
Living people
People from Richmond, British Columbia
Curlers from Winnipeg
World curling champions
Canadian male curlers